Coke N Butter is a mixtape by American rapper O.T. Genasis. It was released on November 12, 2016. The project consists of twelve tracks, with guest appearances from 2 Chainz, T.I., YG, Remy Ma, and Quavo, with production from BeatMonsters, BricksOnDaBeat, Go Grizzly, ITrez Beats, Jereme Jay, Juice 808, LBeatz, Murda Beatz, OG Parker, Yung Lan, and Zaytoven. The mixtape was released through Conglomerate and Atlantic Records.

Track listing

References

2016 mixtape albums
Albums produced by Murda Beatz
Albums produced by Zaytoven
O.T. Genasis albums